Čičevo may refer to:

Čičevo, Konjic, in central Bosnia and Herzegovina
Donje Čičevo, in southern Bosnia and Herzegovina
Gornje Čičevo, in southern Bosnia and Herzegovina
Poljice Čičevo, in southern Bosnia and Herzegovina
Dolno Čičevo, in central Republic of Macedonia
Gorno Čičevo, in central Republic of Macedonia